Tremex fuscicornis (tremex wasp) is a species of horntail, native to Europe and Asia, and has been introduced to Australia, Canada and Chile.

References

Siricidae
Insects described in 1787